Lynford Sackey (born 18 February 2003) is an English professional footballer who plays as a right winger or right back for Bolton Wanderers.

Club career
He made his debut for Reading on 15 September 2020 in a 1–0 EFL Cup defeat at home to Luton Town. In summer 2021, Sackey agreed his first professional contract with the club. On 20 May 2022, Reading confirmed that Sackey would leave the club upon the expiration of his contract. On 17 June 2022, it was announced Sackey would join Bolton Wanderers once his Reading contract expired and would join Bolton's B team.

International career
Born in England, Sackey is of Ghanaian descent. He has been involved in training camps for England youth sides.

Career statistics

References

2003 births
Living people
English footballers
Association football midfielders
Reading F.C. players
Bolton Wanderers F.C. players 
English people of Ghanaian descent